Pura Teresa Belpré y Nogueras (February 2, 1899 – July 1, 1982) was an Afro-Puerto Rican educator who served as the first Puerto Rican librarian in New York City. She was also a writer, collector of folktales, and puppeteer.

Life
Belpré was born in Cidra, Puerto Rico. There is some dispute as to the date of her birth which has been given as February 2, 1899, December 2, 1901 and February 2, 1903. Belpré graduated from Central High School in Santurce, Puerto Rico in 1919 and enrolled at the University of Puerto Rico in Río Piedras, where she originally planned on becoming a teacher. But, in 1920, Belpré interrupted her studies to attend her sister Elisa's wedding in New York City, where she was recruited by a public library effort to hire young women from ethnically diverse backgrounds. This first job led to an remarkable career that had Belpré travel the city, from the Bronx to the Lower East Side, telling stories in both English and Spanish, something that hadn't been done before. Belpré broke the barriers that led the Spanish speaking community to believe the library was "only English." Except for brief interludes, Belpré remained in New York City for the rest of her life.

Librarianship
Belpré's career in the New York Public Library commenced in 1921, and she pioneered the library's outreach within the Puerto Rican community. However, like many of the Puerto Rican women who migrated to New York in the twentieth century, Belpré's first job was in the garment industry. Her Spanish language, community and literary skills soon earned her a position as Hispanic Assistant in a branch of the public library at 135th Street in Harlem, having been recruited and mentored by Ernestine Rose, head of the Harlem library. Belpré became the first Puerto Rican to be hired by the New York Public Library (NYPL).

In 1925 she began her formal studies in the Library School of the New York Public Library. In 1929, due to the increasing numbers of Puerto Ricans settling in southwest Harlem, Belpré was transferred to a branch of the NYPL at 115th Street. She quickly became an active advocate for the Spanish-speaking community by instituting bilingual story hours, buying Spanish language books, and implementing programs based on traditional holidays like the celebration of Three Kings Day. In her outreach efforts, she attended meetings of civic organizations such as the Porto Rican Brotherhood of America and La Liga Puertorriqueña e Hispana. Through Belpré's work, the 115th Street branch became an important cultural center for the Latino residents of New York, even hosting important Latin American figures such as the Mexican muralist Diego Rivera. Belpré continued these efforts at the 110th street (or Aguilar) branch.

Literary career 
Belpré's library career is intimately tied to her literary career. The first story she wrote and published was Pérez and Martina, a love story between a cockroach and a mouse. Belpré also collected many other folktales from Puerto Rico, translated them into English and had them published as children's literature.

In 1940, Belpré met her future husband, the African-American composer and violinist, Clarence Cameron White. They were married on December 26, 1943 and Belpré resigned her position to go on tour with her husband and to devote herself fully to writing. When her husband died in 1960, Belpré returned to part-time work in the library as the Spanish Children's Specialist, which sent her all over the city wherever there were large numbers of Latino children. In 1968, she retired from this position, but was persuaded to work with the newly established South Bronx Library Project, a community outreach program to promote library use and to provide needed services to Latino neighborhoods throughout the Bronx.

Belpré wrote the first major Juan Bobo story published in the United States, Juan Bobo and the Queen's Necklace: A Puerto Rican Folk Tale. It was published in 1962.

Death 
Belpré died on July 1, 1982, having received the New York Mayor's Award for Arts and Culture that same year. Her archives are held and maintained by the Center for Puerto Rican Studies at Hunter College in New York.

Legacy
The Pura Belpré Award was established in 1996 as a homage to Pura Belpré. It is a children's book award, presented annually, to the Latino/Latina writer and illustrator whose work best portrays, affirms, and celebrates the Latino cultural experience in an outstanding work of literature for children and youth. The Pura Belpré Award is co-sponsored by REFORMA: the National Association to Promote Library and Information Services to Latinos and the Spanish-Speaking and the Association for Library Service to Children (ALSC), a division of the American Library Association (ALA). The Northeast Chapter of REFORMA named its children's book achievement award in her honor in the 1980s.

In the Bronx, New York Public School 64 on Walton Avenue near 170th Street has been named after her. In 2022, 109th Street and Lexington Avenue in East Harlem was named Pura Belpré Way.

A documentary film about the life and work of Pura Belpré was produced in 2011, and is available for viewing at the Centro de Estudios Puertorriqueños at Hunter College.

The Pura Belpré Papers, held at the Archives of the Puerto Rican Diaspora, Center for Puerto Rican Studies "are an important source for the study of Puerto Rican children's literature, folk tales, and legends. They are valuable for examining relationships between the Puerto Rican community and a major institution such as the New York Public Library. Additionally, the papers document the formation and organizational development of the Puerto Rican community in New York City."

Bibliography of Belpré's works
Books in English

 Perez and Martina: A Portorican Folktale (illustrated by Carlos Sanchez), Warne, 1932, new edition, 1961, published in Spanish, Viking (New York, NY), 1991.
 The Three Magi found in the anthology "The Animals' Christmas" by Anne Thaxter Eaton, 1944.
 The Tiger and the Rabbit, and Other Tales (illustrated by Kay Peterson Parker), Houghton, 1946, new edition (illustrated by Tomie de Paola), Lippincott, 1965.
 Juan Bobo and the Queen's Necklace: A Puerto Rican Folk Tale (illustrated by Christine Price), Warne, 1962.
 Ote: A Puerto Rican Folk Tale (illustrated by Paul Galdone), Pantheon, 1969.
 Santiago (illustrated by Symeon Shimin), Warne, 1969.
 (With Mary K. Conwell) Libros en Espanol: An Annotated List of Children's Books in Spanish, New York Public Library, 1971.
 Dance of the Animals: A Puerto Rican Folk Tale (illustrated by P. Galdone), Warne, 1972.
 Once in Puerto Rico (illustrated by C. Price), Warne, 1973.
 A Rainbow-Colored Horse (illustrated by Antonio Martorell), Warne, 1978.
 Firefly Summer, Piñata Books (Houston, TX), 1996.
 The Stone Dog

Translations into Spanish
 Munro Leaf, El Cuento de Ferdinand ("The Story of Ferdinand"), Viking, 1962.
 Crosby N. Bonsall, Caso del Forastero Hambriento ("Case of the Hungry Stranger"), Harper, 1969.
 Carla Greene, Camioneros: ¿Qué Hacen? ("Truck Drivers: What Do They Do?"), Harper, 1969.
 Syd Hoff, Danielito y el Dinosauro ("Danny and the Dinosaur"), Harper, 1969.
 Leonard Kessler, Aquí Viene el Ponchado ("Here Comes the Strikeout"), Harper, 1969.
 Else Holmelund Minarik, Osito ("Little Bear"), Harper, 1969.
 Millicent E. Selsam, Teresita y las Orugas ("Terry and the Caterpillar"), Harper, 1969.
 Paul Newman, Ningún Lugar para Jugar ("No Place to Play"), Grosset, 1971.

See also
 List of Latin American writers
 List of Puerto Rican writers
 List of Puerto Ricans
 Puerto Rican literature
 Multi-Ethnic Literature of the United States

Additional sources
 
Contemporary Authors Online, Gale, 2006. Reproduced in Biography Resource Center. Farmington Hills, Mich.: Thomson Gale. 2006. 
Núñez, Victoria. Memory, History, and Latino Migrant Literary Practices and New Historical Perspectives on Puerto Rican Migrations to New York.

Notes

References

External links
 

1899 births
1982 deaths
American folklorists
Women folklorists
American librarians
American women librarians
People from Cidra, Puerto Rico
Puerto Rican women writers
Hispanic and Latino American librarians
Puerto Rican short story writers
20th-century American women
Puerto Rican people of African descent